The 1916 Copa Aldao was a football club competition between Racing and Nacional on December 3 of this very year. It was the second staging of this tournament contested between the league champions of Argentina and Uruguay.

Nacional became champions for the first time after defeating Racing 2–1 in a single match.

Qualified teams

Rules
The cup was played over one leg at neutral venue in Buenos Aires. In case of a draw, a rematch would be played in Montevideo.

Match details

References 

1916 in Uruguayan football
1916 in Argentine football
a
a
Football in Buenos Aires